Harel Locker (born 1965) is an Israeli lawyer and civil servant. He is the Chairman of the Board at Israel Aerospace Industries He has been the Director General of the Israeli Prime Minister's Office since December 2011. He is a lawyer, licensed in Israel and New York State, specializing in economic and trade related issues.

Biography

Locker was born and raised in Tel Aviv. He is a ninth-generation Israeli on his mother's side. His mother, Rivkah, was born in the Old City of Jerusalem. His father, Martin, was a Holocaust survivor from the Transnistria camp, and was a member of Beitar and the Irgun; He immigrated to Israel on board the Irgun cargo ship Altalena, which was loaded with weapons. Locker's brother is Major-General Yohanan Locker, former deputy Air Force Commander and former Military Secretary to Prime Minister Benjamin Netanyahu.  He has another brother – heart surgeon Prof. Chaim Locker.

Locker served in the Israeli Defense Force as a soldier in the Intelligence Corps and as a combat intelligence officer in Lebanon and Samaria. He was released with the rank of captain. He earned an LL.B. from Tel Aviv University’s Buchman Faculty of Law and a B.A. degree in accounting from the Tel Aviv University Recanati Business School. He later received his LL.M. (with distinction) in taxation from Georgetown University, Washington DC.

Locker is married to Adv. Shiri Milo and has three children.

Career

Locker began his legal career as an intern at the law firm of Yoram Danziger and Avigdor Klagsbald. He became a member of the Israel Bar Association in 1995. He was a partner at the law firm of Shekel & Co. until 2000, and between 2001 and 2004, he worked in the Wall Street law firm of Fried, Frank, Harris, Shriver and Jacobson. After returning to Israel, he established Shohat, Locker & Co., where he was a managing partner. In 2007, the firm merged with S. Friedman and Co., one of the oldest law firms in Israel, and Locker became a senior partner and a member of the management team.

Prime Minister’s Office

In 2011, Prime Minister Benjamin Netanyahu appointed Harel Locker Director General of the Prime Minister's Office. The Director General of the Prime Minister's Office directs policy and staff work carried out at the Prime Minister's Office on a variety of economic, social and civilian matters. The Director General coordinates the staff work of the Government on these issues on behalf of the Prime Minister, and leads and is a central partner in large-scale national projects on the Government's and Prime Minister's agendas.

As such, the Director General of the Prime Minister's Office deals with the following subjects:
 Applying the Government's basic principles and implementing its policy on civil, social and economic subjects in cooperation with government ministries, with an emphasis on reducing poverty and social gaps in Israeli society, on one hand, and on the other - Developing New Growth Engines.
 Leading reforms in Israel's public service, in order to provide the governmental system with better and more effective management capabilities
 Establishing and strengthening the relations between the Israeli Government, civil society and the business sector, in order to improve the cooperation and coordination between the sectors
 Improving the capabilities of the Prime Minister's Office as an administrative unit that plans policy and integrates the work of all government ministries.

Harel Locker's activities and achievements as Director General of the Prime Minister's Office (as of August 2013)
 Leading the public service reform
 Leading the relocation project of IDF bases to the Negev and the ensuing economic development plan for the Negev 
 Formulating the State Budget on behalf of the Prime Minister, together with Minister of Finance
 Managing and leading the forum of directors general of government ministries
 Coordinating the Government's effort to remove obstacles in the area of housing
 Devising the “Locker Deal” which prevented the closing of Channel 10
 Integrating the plan for natural gas usage in Israel
 Encouraging foreign investors to conduct business activity in Israel
 Enhancing economic ties with The US, China and Latin American countries
 Coordinating the efforts to privatize governmental companies
 Leading the reform to enhance government ministries’ performance
 Reducing governmental bureaucracy and the bureaucratic burden
 Launching The "Digital Israel" initiative, which seeks to improve public access to the education, health and welfare systems regardless of where people live in Israel. The project will also encourage e-trading, reduce bureaucracy and streamline a wide array of government services via Fiber-Optic cables
 Promoting the Israeli efforts in the cyber protection arena

The Director General of the Prime Minister's Office heads the Financial and Social Headquarters (which was established following the conclusions of the Kucik Report of April 2011, regarding the Prime Minister's Office staffer). The Financial and Social Headquarters, including all its divisions and departments, is responsible for all economic and social matters in the Prime Minister's Office. The departments operating under the Director General of the Prime Minister's Office are: the Department for Governance and Social Affairs, the Department for Internal Affairs and Development and the Department for Economy and Infrastructure.

References

Living people
Israeli civil servants
Tel Aviv University alumni
People from Tel Aviv
Israeli lawyers
People associated with Fried, Frank, Harris, Shriver & Jacobson
Year of birth missing (living people)